The Williams FW08 was a Formula One car designed by Frank Dernie, which debuted at the 1982 Belgian Grand Prix held at the Zolder circuit. An evolution of the FW07 that it replaced, the car was used by Finnish driver Keke Rosberg to win the 1982 World Drivers' Championship.

Overview 
The FW08B was a six-wheeled (four driven wheels at the rear and two undriven wheels at the front) variant that originated from the FW07D (also six-wheeled). It never raced. Patrick Head specifically said that the reason it was banned was because "someone in a FOCA meeting said it would drive up costs and cause chaos during pitstops". The FIA promptly limited the number of wheels for all cars to four, of which only two may be driven.

The FW08 was a development of the Williams FW07 but featured a shorter wheelbase and much stiffer chassis to cope with the higher g-loading that the minimum  ride height regulations introduced in 1981 demanded. While McLaren and others pioneered the use of carbon fibre chassis, Patrick Head stuck to aluminium honeycomb for the new car. The FW08 suited Keke Rosberg's aggressive driving style and he used it to good effect, winning the 1982 Swiss Grand Prix and scoring several other podium places to snatch the championship. Rosberg was on course to win in Belgium on the car's debut but tyre trouble caused him to drop back in the closing stages of the race. The FW08 was Frank Dernie's favourite car of all those he worked on during his time with the team.

During wind tunnel testing at Imperial College, Frank Dernie recorded that the FW08B had a lift to drag ratio of a remarkable 8:1 - eight parts downforce to just one part drag, giving the FW08 supreme aerodynamic efficiency and giving Keke Rosberg a chance to compete with the far more powerful turbo Renault and Ferrari during the 1982 season (the turbo runners of 1982 were producing at least 570 BHP at over 11,000 RPM in race trim, compared to the 515 BHP of the best Cosworth runners). During 1982 Keke Rosberg often qualified and raced without front wings as the downforce generated by the underbody Venturi tunnels was so huge that a front wing was not required. Removing the front wing meant better penetration through the air, thus giving the FW08 straightline speed which was regularly the best of a Cosworth DFV equipped runner and allowing Rosberg the opportunity of taking on the far more powerful turbos thanks to a combination of his driving skill and the lower weight of the FW08 compared to the heavy bulky turbo runners of 1982.

The car was updated for the 1983 Formula One season to become the FW08C. Under new regulations all ground effect was out and flat bottom cars were in, meaning nearly all the cars in Formula One had to be heavily modified or replaced and the FW08 was no different. Against the turbo cars of Renault, Brabham and Ferrari, Williams were not expected to do as well as they did. Jacques Laffite rejoined the team, having started his F1 career with Frank Williams Racing Cars back in 1974. Rosberg opened the season with pole position at the Brazilian Grand Prix (the last for a Ford-Cosworth DFV powered car) and scored the car's last win, at the 1983 Monaco Grand Prix. He eventually finished fifth in the Drivers' Championship, while Williams finished the season in fourth place, the best of the Cosworth-powered cars.

The FW08C also has the distinction of being the first Formula One car ever driven by Ayrton Senna, at Donington Park in July 1983, after he badgered team boss Frank Williams for a test after being sat beside him on a flight. Senna completed 40 laps and lapped the circuit faster than anyone else had managed in the car, including 1983 race drivers Rosberg and Laffite.

The FW08C was retired after the 1983 European Grand Prix at Brands Hatch. A third car was actually raced by the team at this race and was driven to 13th place by Jonathan Palmer. It was replaced by the Honda powered FW09 for the last race of the season in South Africa.

Early in 1983, Rosberg drove his FW08C to victory in the Race of Champions at Brands Hatch. To date this is the last non-championship Formula One races to have been held.

In 1985 two FW08C were entered by PMC Motorsport in some races of the Formula 3000 championship, driven by Thierry Tassin and Lamberto Leoni. The results achieved were unremarkable apart from Lamberto Leoni's two third place finishes, in the Pau street race and at the Österreichring.

Complete Formula One results
(key) (results in bold indicate pole position)

* 14 points in  scored using the FW07C* 2 points in  scored by Honda turbo powered Williams FW09

References

Sources

Williams Formula One cars
1982 Formula One season cars
1983 Formula One season cars
Formula One championship-winning cars